Mansfield Woodhouse was an Urban District in Nottinghamshire, England from 1894 to 1974. It was created under the Local Government Act 1894.

The district was abolished in 1974 under the Local Government Act 1972 and combined with the Municipal Borough of Mansfield and Warsop Urban District to form the new Mansfield district.

References

Districts of England created by the Local Government Act 1894
Districts of England abolished by the Local Government Act 1972
History of Nottinghamshire
Urban districts of Nottinghamshire
Mansfield District